Marei (Arabic: مرعي) is an Arabic name. People with the name include:

Given name
Marei Al-Moqaadi (born 1988), Saudi football striker 
Marei Al Ramly (born 1977), Libyan football midfielder

Surname
Ahmed Marei (born 1959), Egyptian basketball coach and former player
Ahmed Marei (Jordanian footballer) (born 1987), Jordanian football forward
Assem Marei (born 1992), Egyptian basketball player, son of Ahmed
Bara' Marei (born 1994), Jordanian footballer
Essam Marei, Egyptian footballer
Mamdouh Marei (1938–2018), Egyptian jurist and politician

Arabic-language surnames
Arabic masculine given names